Charles Henry Tompkins (September 12, 1830 – January 18, 1915) was an American officer who served as a Union Army colonel, who received an appointment to the brevet grade of Brigadier General of volunteers during the American Civil War. He was a recipient of the Medal of Honor for valor in action on June 1, 1861, in the Battle of Fairfax Court House (June 1861). This was the first action in the Civil War for which a Union Army officer would receive the Medal of Honor, although it was not awarded until 1893. He is not to be confused with another Union officer, Brevet Brigadier General Charles H. Tompkins (d. 1895) who commanded the 1st Rhode Island Light Artillery Regiment.

Early life and career
Tompkins was born in Fort Monroe, Virginia on September 12, 1830.  He was the son of Colonel Daniel D. Tompkins, a career Army officer, and was the grand nephew of Vice President Daniel D. Tompkins.

He received an appointment to West Point from Brooklyn, New York as a member of the class of 1851, though he did not graduate with his class. He resigned in 1849 for unspecified reasons.  Tompkins pursued private business interests until enlisting as a Private in the First Dragoons in January 1856, rising to the rank of sergeant before his enlistment ended in January 1861.  He served on the western frontier and was recognized for his performance at the Second Battle of Pyramid Lake near Pyramid Lake, Nevada in June 1860.

Tompkins received his commission as a 2nd lieutenant in the 2nd U.S. Cavalry Regiment in March 1861. It was in this unit that he gained fame for his heroism in action at the Battle of Fairfax Court House (June 1861) while a 1st lieutenant, to which he was promoted on April 30, 1861.

Tompkins was reassigned to the 5th U.S. Cavalry Regiment on August 3, 1861, and served as the regimental quartermaster.  On April 24, 1862, he received a volunteer commission as colonel of the 1st Vermont Cavalry.  He resigned his volunteer commission on September 9, 1862.

During the war, he received brevets (honorary promotions) to major, lieutenant colonel, colonel and brigadier general.

Medal of Honor citation
"Twice charged through the enemy's lines and, taking a carbine from an enlisted man, shot the enemy's captain." Captain John Quincy Marr was the first Confederate soldier killed in combat during the Civil War.

Postbellum
Tompkins was appointed as one of the nine officers assigned to the military commission investigating the conspirators involved in President Lincoln's assassination.  Because of a dispute with General Grant, between 1866 and 1881 he was posted to numerous remote and austere western posts.

He served the remainder of his career in the Quartermaster Corps, rising to Assistant Quartermaster General on January 24, 1881.  The position of Assistant Quartermaster General, carried a rank of colonel in the Regular Army, to which Tompkins was promoted the same day.  He finished his career serving on the east coast, voluntarily retiring on September 12, 1894.

Tompkins suffered a broken leg in September 1914 and the wound never healed properly.  He died of sepsis in Washington, D.C. on January 18, 1915.  He is buried at Oak Hill Cemetery in Washington, DC.

Personal life
Tompkins married Ms. Augusta Root Hobbie of New York on December 17, 1862 . They had seven children, four of whom reached adulthood. His eldest son, Selah Reeve Hobbie (“Tommy”) Tompkins, was an Army officer who became Colonel of the 7th Cavalry Regiment. His second son, Colonel Frank Tompkins, also served as a career army officer including notable participation as a major in the 13th Cavalry in both the raid on Columbus, New Mexico by Pancho Villa and the Punitive Expedition that followed for which he was awarded the Distinguished Service Cross.

See also

 List of Medal of Honor recipients

References

1830 births
1915 deaths
Union Army colonels
United States Army colonels
United States Army Medal of Honor recipients
United States Military Academy alumni
American Civil War recipients of the Medal of Honor
Burials at Oak Hill Cemetery (Washington, D.C.)